, also known by his Chinese style name , was a bureaucrat of the Ryukyu Kingdom.

Yonabaru Ryōō served as a member of Sanshikan from 1805 to 1820. In 1816, he translated Tongmeng Xuzhi, a Confucian textbook suitable for teaching young children written by Zhu Xi, into Japanese, and taught at school.

References

1761 births
1820 deaths
Ueekata
Sanshikan
People of the Ryukyu Kingdom
Ryukyuan people
18th-century Ryukyuan people
19th-century Ryukyuan people